Oriol is a Catalan name, which can be found as a given name or a surname. It derives from the Latin word aureus (golden). It was originally just a surname, but started to be used as a given name in honour of Saint Joseph Oriol. It may refer to:

Given name 
Oriol Elcacho, Spanish male model from Catalonia
Oriol Junqueras, Spanish politician from Catalonia
Oriol Lozano, Spanish footballer from Catalonia
Oriol Martorell i Codina, Spanish music director, professor and politician from Catalonia
Oriol Riera, Spanish football player from Catalonia
Oriol Ripol, Spanish rugby union player from Catalonia
Oriol Romeu, Spanish football player from Catalonia
Oriol Salvia, Spanish squash player from Catalonia
Oriol Servià, Spanish race car driver from Catalonia

Surname 
Estevan Oriol, Mexican American photographer
Saint Joseph Oriol, Spanish Catholic saint
José Luis de Oriol y Urigüen, Spanish Carlist politician
José María de Oriol y Urquijo, Spanish politician

See also
Auriol (disambiguation), French name also derived from "aureus"
Oryol, place in Russia also known as Oriol

References 

Catalan masculine given names
Catalan-language surnames